The 2015 Dartmouth Big Green football team represented Dartmouth College in the 2015 NCAA Division I FCS football season. The Big Green were led by head coach Buddy Teevens in his 11th straight year and 16th overall. The played their home games at Memorial Field. They were a member of the Ivy League. They finished the season 9–1 overall and 6–1 in Ivy League play to place three-way tie for the Ivy League title with Harvard and Penn. Dartmouth averaged 6,660 fans per game.

Schedule

Ranking movements

References

Dartmouth
Dartmouth Big Green football seasons
Ivy League football champion seasons
Dartmouth Big Green football